Pterolophia quadrivittata is a species of beetle in the family Cerambycidae. It was described by Stephan von Breuning in 1938. It is known from Vietnam and India.

References

quadrivittata
Beetles described in 1938
Beetles of Asia
Taxa named by Stephan von Breuning (entomologist)